Hydroxypropanal may refer to:

 Lactaldehyde (2-hydroxypropanal)
 Reuterin (3-hydroxypropanal)